Baza Sportivă Paleu (Paleu Sports Base) is a multi-purpose stadium in Paleu, Bihor County, Romania. It is currently used mostly for football matches, is the home ground of CA Oradea and has a capacity of 1,500 people (300 on seats). In the past, the stadium was the home ground of FC Paleu and Dinamo Oradea.

Paleu Sports Base is composed of two grass football pitches, an artificial turf football pitch and one indoor arena.

References

External links
Baza Sportivă Paleu at soccerway.com

Football venues in Romania
Sport in Bihor County
Buildings and structures in Bihor County